The Mäntyharju railway station is located in the municipality and central urban area of Mäntyharju, Finland. It is located along the Kouvola–Iisalmi railway, and its neighboring stations are Kouvola in the south and Mikkeli in the north.

The Finnish Heritage Agency has declared the Mäntyharju station area a protected culture site of national importance.

Services 
Mäntyharju is served by long-distance services (InterCity and Pendolino) that pass through the Kouvola-Iisalmi line.

External links 
 Train departures and arrivals at Mäntyharju on Finrail

References 

Mäntyharju
Railway stations in South Savo